Justin Randolph Willis (born April 15, 1988) is an American soccer player who currently plays for Carolina RailHawks in the North American Soccer League.

Career

High school
Justin played varsity soccer all four years at Wakefield High School in North Carolina from 2002 to 2006, He scored a goal in his first-ever high school varsity match. He also went on to become a two-time All-Conference selection and team captain.

College and amateur
Willis started his college career at High Point University from 2006 to 2009, where he appeared in 41 games, scoring 3 goals and 10 assists. Willis was named as an All-Freshman Honorable mention in 2006. Willis was named the team captain in 2009 before suffering a broken ankle 4 games into the season. Willis was able to medical redshirt during the 2009 season before he went on to later transfer at the end of the season to North Carolina State University of the Atlantic Coast Conference. Willis led the NC State Wolfpack to a top-20 ranking in the 2011 season. Willis was named to the 2011 All-Tournament team at The Duke Invitational. Willis started and played in all 21 games for the Wolfpack at right back, where he had an assist in the game-winner over #4 Boston College.

Throughout his college career Willis played for both the Cary Clarets and their predecessor Cary RailHawks U23's in the USL Premier Development League. In 2011 Willis played a key role in helping the Carolina Railhawks u23s win the Regional and National Championship.

External links
 Carolina RailHawks bio

1988 births
Living people
American soccer players
High Point Panthers men's soccer players
NC State Wolfpack men's soccer players
Cary Clarets players
North Carolina FC players
USL League Two players
North American Soccer League players
Association football defenders
Soccer players from Raleigh, North Carolina
Soccer players from North Carolina
North Carolina FC U23 players